The Karnatak Vidyavardhaka Sangha (Kannada: ಕರ್ನಾಟಕ ವಿದ್ಯಾವರ್ಧಕ ಸಂಘ) was an institution established on 20 July 1890 by Sri R H Deshpande in Dharwad, India which was then under the British rule of Bombay Presidency. This institution was established with the sole objective of promoting Kannada culture and language in times when the Kannada speaking regions of present day Karnataka were split into six different areas, where Kannada was often overshadowed by other languages. Soon the Sangha morphed into a hub for the Karnataka Ekikarana (Unification) movement and played a pivotal role in the eventual unification of Karnataka. It inspired the establishment of several institutions and organisations across the state. For its invaluable services and contributions to Kannada and Karnataka, this institution was awarded the Ekikarana Award by the Government of Karnataka on the occasion of the 50th year celebrations of Karnataka state in 2006.

History 

After the downfall of the Vijayanagara Empire, through the period of British rule, Karnataka was divided into six parts, namely Bombay Karnataka, Hyderabad Karnataka, Madras Karnataka, Coorg, Mysore and smaller princely states like Mudhol, Jamkhandi, Savanur etc. The result was that the Kannada culture and language in these areas were eclipsed by other cultures. For example, in the four districts of Dharwad, Belgaum, North Kanara and Bijapur districts that comprised Bombay Karnataka, Kannada culture and language had suffered severe setbacks due to prolonged Maratha rule. When the British introduced their system of education in this area, they were under the impression that these districts were part of Maharashtra and started Marathi schools there. Mr. Walter Elliott, Deputy Collector of Dharwad, soon found that the language of the people was Kannada, but Marathi was imposed upon them. Out of sympathy for the Kannada people and his knowledge of Kannada, Elliot started Kannada schools in Dharwad around 1830. Balashastri Jambhekar, an education officer of the Bombay Government, also felt that the since the language of the people was Kannada, there should be Kannada schools in these four districts.

A determined effort to establish Kannada schools was made by Mr. W. A. Russell, who after serving as Professor in the Deccan College at Pune, was appointed as Educational Inspector of the Southern Division of the Bombay Province. To Russell's amazement, he found that there were not a sufficient number of persons who could teach Kannada effectively. He induced officers in other departments of the Bombay Government who were Kannadigas and who knew Kannada sufficiently to join the Education Department. Among them were Deputy Chennabasappa, Gangadhara Madivaleshwara Turumari, Srinivas Rodda, Bhujangarao Huilgol, Venkatarangu Katti and others. When Mr. R. H. Deshpande who was studying in the Deccan college passed his M.A. examination with a gold medal in 1884, Russell persuaded him to join the Education department and assured him that he would, with his stellar academic career, soon replace him as the Inspector of the Southern Division. True to his word, Russell promoted Mr. Deshpande as deputy inspector of Karwar within a few months of his joining Sardar High School in Belgaum. However, Mr. Russell was subsequently shifted from his post and in his place a Marathi officer was posted. For the next 25 years, three Marathi officers ruled over the Bombay Karnataka area and introduced Marathi in the Kannada schools. Mr. Deshpande naturally resented this and decided to revolt against this foisting of Marathi on Kannada children, but as a Government servant, there were restrictions on what he could do. He took shelter under the British policy of encouraging education in the vernacular language and decided to establish a Sangha for the protection of Kannada and the Unification of the Karnataka areas. Thus the Karnataka Vidyavardhaka Sangha came into being on 20 July 1890.

Charter of the Sangha 
The first charter of the new body was to publish books in Kannada. Kannada could live and thrive only through books and journals so the Sangha brought out its first publication two years after it was established and then came the first Kannada literary and cultural journal Vagabhushana. Since Kannada was the mother tongue of the rulers of Mysore, Mr. Deshpande enlisted the support of the Maharaja of Mysore, Shri Chamaraja Wodeyar for the Sangha. The Government of Mysore used to send its scholars to conduct Kannada exams which the Sangha used to hold periodically. It also gave money for the construction of a building for the Sangha which was appropriately named as Chamaraja Mandira.

The Sangha organized the first conference of Kannada writers in Dharwad in 1905. This was the precursor of the present-day Kannada Sahitya Sammelan (annual literary conference). In 1912, when Sir Mokshagundam Vishweshwaraiah became the Diwan of Mysore, Mr. R. H. Deshpande who knew him intimately, wrote him a letter congratulating him on his appointment and further requested him to foster more attention on the development of the Kannada language and culture. As a result, Mysore convened the first conference of Kannada writers from all parts of the country in Bangalore in 1915. The conference decided among other things to establish the Kannada Sahitya Parishat on the lines of the Karnataka Vidyavardhak Sangha. Mr. Deshpande and
Justice R.A. Jagirdar (later the first Vice Chancellor of Karnataka University), served on a committee appointed by the conference to draft the constitution of the Kannada Sahitya Parishat. Thus came into being yet another organization working for the welfare of the Kannada country as a whole.

Resolution of Unification 

Strengthened by these developments, the Karnatak Vidhyavardhak Sangha at its meeting on 7 October 1917 passed a resolution urging the Government of India to bring under one administrative unit all the Kannada towns, talukas and districts then under the British rule and name the unit as the Karnataka province. This demand was reiterated in 1923 and on 25 February 1935 telegrams were sent to the Viceroy to bring under one administration all Kannada speaking areas. The Sangha was responsible to a certain extent in the founding of the Karnataka Research Institute in 1937. the Karnataka University in 1949, the All India Radio station at Dharwad in 1950, etc.

Golden Jubilee 

The Sangha's Golden Jubilee was celebrated in 1940. As a prelude to the celebrations, the Sangha organized a function at which the portrait of the founder of the Sangha, Mr. R.H.Deshpande was unveiled by Prof. B.M. Sreekantiah, popularly known as Kannadada Kanva on 14 April 1940.

Today's Sangha 
In recent years, the Sangha has enlarged its scope of activities and for this purpose has set up committees to conduct activities in the areas of Education, publications, Literary, Art and Culture, Women's Issues, Science and Technology, Social Welfare, Children's Issues, Folklore, etc. The Sangha is housed in a historic building across from the Municipal Corporation in the heart of Dharwad town. On 24 October  2016, for the first time in its 126-year history, the Sangha has decided to provide reservation in the executive committee for Scheduled Caste/Scheduled Tribe and women.

References

 The Story of the Karnataka Vidyavardhak Sangha. By Prof. K.S. Deshpande, Shrihari Prakashan, Dharwad. 2003.
 When Kannada was in distress - A report in the Deccan Herald

History of Karnataka
Politics of Karnataka
Kannada language
Language advocacy organizations